Jarell Amorin Quansah (born 29 January 2003) is an English professional footballer who plays as a centre back for Bristol Rovers on loan from  club Liverpool.

Club career 
Quansah joined Liverpool at the age of five, from Woolston Rovers in his native Warrington.

Quansah signed his first contract with the Premier League club on 4 February 2021. During this 2020–21 season, he captained the Liverpool Under-18 side that made it to the FA Youth Cup final, along the likes of Billy Koumetio, Melkamu Frauendorf, Max Woltman, Conor Bradley or Luke Chambers.

The next season, he captained the UEFA Youth League team, whilst also playing in the Premier League 2 with the reserves, and playing a key role with the latter during the Lancashire Senior Cup victory. 

Quansah then made his first appearance on the team sheet with the senior team, in the Premier League and EFL Cup, not coming off the bench however as Liverpool won both domestic cups, finishing just two victories short from a historic quadruple.

On 20 January 2023, Quansah joined League One club Bristol Rovers on loan until the end of the season. He made his senior debut on 28 January, playing the duration of a 5–1 defeat to Morecambe, impressing despite the result. Following an impressive performance in a 0–0 draw with Ipswich Town, Rovers' manager Joey Barton predicted Quansah to be destined for the top level of the game, citing his ability on the ball as a key asset. On 18 March, he received a first career sending-off for violent conduct in the last minutes of a 2–0 home defeat to Portsmouth.

International career 
Eligible to play for England as well as Scotland, Ghana, and Barbados through his grandparents, Jarell Quansah first played with England youth teams, from under-16s level to the under-19s.

In June 2022, Quansah was included in the England squad for the 2022 Under-19 Euro's. Starting all games as a centre-back during the competition in Slovakia, he played a key role in England's successful campaign. Most notably he scored the winner in the 2-1 semi-final victory against Italy. 
On 1 July 2022, Quansah started in the final and provided an assist for Callum Doyle to score the equalizer as England went on to defeat Israel 3-1 in extra time to win the tournament. His performances during the competition led to his inclusion in the UEFA team of the tournament.

Style of play 
Jarell Quansah is a right-footed centre-back, also playing regularly as a right-back during his youth years.

Quansah is described as a defender who likes to play the ball, able to break the lines with his long passes, while staying calm and focused in defense, strong in aerial duels, with the ability to press high, as required by Jürgen Klopp's system at Anfield.

Career statistics

Honours 

 Liverpool FC
 FA Youth Cup runner-up: 2020–21
 Lancashire Senior Cup: 2022
England U19
 UEFA European Under-19 Championship: 2022
Individual
 UEFA European Under-19 Championship Team of the Tournament: 2022

References

External links

2003 births
Living people
English footballers
Scottish footballers
England youth international footballers
Association football defenders
Footballers from Warrington
Liverpool F.C. players
Bristol Rovers F.C. players
English sportspeople of Barbadian descent
English sportspeople of Ghanaian descent
English people of Scottish descent
English people of Zimbabwean descent
English Football League players